The Primetime Emmy Award for Outstanding Period Costumes is presented as part of the Primetime Emmy Awards. In 2015, categories for period/fantasy and contemporary costumes were created. The categories were divided in 2018 for period and fantasy/sci-fi costumes. They replaced the retired categories for Outstanding Costumes for a Miniseries, Movie, or Special and Outstanding Costumes for a Series.

Rules require that nominations are distributed proportionally among regular series and limited series/movies, based on the number of submissions of each. For instance, if two-fifths of submissions are limited series/movies then two of the five nominees will be limited series/movies.

Winners and nominations

2010s

2020s

Programs with multiple wins
3 wins
 The Crown

Programs with multiple nominations
Totals include nominees for Outstanding Costumes for a Series.

6 nominations
 Downton Abbey

5 nominations
 Boardwalk Empire
 Mad Men

4 nominations
 The Crown
 The Marvelous Mrs. Maisel
 Remember WENN
 That '70s Show
 The Tudors

3 nominations
 The Borgias
 Deadwood
 Dr. Quinn, Medicine Woman
 Pose 
 Road to Avonlea

2 nominations
 Bridgerton
 Carnivàle
 Genius
 Homefront
 I'll Fly Away
 The Magnificent Seven
 Outlander
 Rome
 The Young Indiana Jones Chronicles

Notes

References

Outstanding Period Costumes